Thomas Lange (born 1964) is a German rower and Olympic medallist.

Thomas Lange may also refer to:

 Thomas Lange (novelist) (1829–1887), Danish novelist

See also
 Thomas Lang (disambiguation)